Psathyrella corrugis, is the type species of the basidiomycete fungus genus Psathyrella and family Psathyrellaceae. Originally described from Europe as Agaricus corrugis, the species is considered non-toxic but lacking in flesh, flavor and texture. It is inedible.

Nomenclature
The lectotype of Psathyrella is Psathyrella gracilis, however P. corrugis was published in 1794, 27 years before P. gracilis was first published, making P. corrugis the correct name. The name given here is according to Index Fungorum.

Description
The cap is 1–4 cm wide, bell-shaped and translucent when young; it flattens and becomes opaque with age. The gills are slightly reddish. The spores are purple-brown, elliptical, and smooth.

It can be found growing around areas of dead wood.

The species sometimes fruits with Tubaria furfuracea. A similar species is Psathyrella candolleana.

Gallery

References

External links
 

Psathyrellaceae
Inedible fungi